The IAS 11 standard of International Accounting Standards set out requirements for the accounting treatment of the revenue and costs associated with long-term construction contracts. By their nature, construction activities and contracts are long-term projects, often beginning and ending in different accounting periods. Until its replacement with IFRS 15 in January 2018, IAS 11 helped accountants with measuring to what extent costs, revenue and possible profit or loss on the project are incurred in each period.

History 
This is a timeline of IAS 11:

Content 
How accounting revenue and costs are to be recognized depends first on whether the stage of completion of a project can be reliably measured. If this is the case, cost and revenue (including profit if any) can be recognized up to the percentage of completion during the current accounting period. If the stage of completion of a project cannot be reliably measured, the revenue can only be recognized up to the costs that have been incurred and any profit is only recognized at the end of the last accounting period. In the case a company is expecting to make a loss on the contract, this loss will be immediately recognized in the current accounting period.

References

International Accounting Standards
International Financial Reporting Standards
Civil engineering